Diana Rouvas (born 29 January 1984) is an Australian singer-songwriter previously signed to Universal Music Australia. In 2019, she won The Voice Australia, against Daniel Shaw. She was born in Sydney to a Greek father and Australian mother.

Career and background
Rouvas started vocal training at age four, and writing at age eight. She was on stage at an early age performing, and relocated to the United States of America at 16 to pursue her music career as a singer-songwriter. In 2001, at 17 she toured with Australian artist Tina Arena as a backing vocalist, visiting France and China. In 2006 Diana represented Australia in G'day LA celebrations in Los Angeles. In 2006 she recorded and released an original Extended Play titled Never Said Hello.

2012–2018: The Voice 2012
In 2012, Rouvas auditioned for the first season of The Voice, performing "Work It Out" and was selected on Team Keith Urban. She made it to the final top eight. Two of the songs she performed on the show reached the top 30 on the ARIA Charts.

In October 2012, Rouvas released "Run" with Damien Leith. The song was the second single from Leith's fifth studio album, Now & Then.

Rouvas was signed to Universal Music Australia, and in April 2014, released the single "Heart of Goodbye" which she co-wrote with producer and songwriter Louis Schoorl. An EP was planned but never released. Upon her request, in 2015 Diana was released from her Universal Music Australia contract.

2019: The Voice 2019 and Eurovision – Australia Decides
In 2019, Rouvas returned and auditioned for The Voice (Australian season 8) and chose Team Boy George. On 7 July 2019, Rouvas was announced as the winner.

 denotes winner.

Her debut single "Wait For No One" was released immediately after the finale on 7 July. The track failed to break into the ARIA top 500, shifting less than 800 units during its release week. Remixes were released in August 2019.

In December 2019, Rouvas was announced as a participant in Eurovision - Australia Decides, in an attempt to represent Australia in the Eurovision Song Contest 2020. Her song "Can We Make Heaven" finished 7th in a field of 10.

Discography

EPs

Singles

Other charted songs

References

External links 

 
 
 
 

1984 births
Living people
Australian singer-songwriters
Australian people of Greek descent
21st-century Australian singers
21st-century Australian women singers
The Voice (Australian TV series) contestants
The Voice (franchise) winners
Australian women singer-songwriters